United Steelworkers of America v. Weber, 443 U.S. 193 (1979), was a case regarding affirmative action in which the United States Supreme Court held that Title VII of the Civil Rights Act of 1964, which prohibits racial discrimination by private employers, does not condemn all private, voluntary, race-conscious affirmative action plans. The Court's decision reversed lower courts' rulings in favor of Brian Weber whose lawsuit beginning in 1974 challenged his employer's hiring practices.

Facts
Brian Weber was 32 years old, white, and worked as a laboratory assistant at a chemical plant. His company, Kaiser Aluminum and Chemical Corp, had a policy where trainees were selected on the basis of seniority, with the proviso that at least 50% of the trainees were to be black until the percentage of black skilled craft workers in the plant approximated the percentage of blacks in the local labor force. The plan derived from a  collective bargaining agreement with the United Steelworkers of America that covered terms and conditions of employment at 15 Kaiser plants. During the plan's first year of operation, seven black and six white trainees were selected from the plant's production workforce, with certain white production workers passed over despite having more seniority than the selected black workers. Having been so
passed over despite his greater seniority, Weber claimed the filling of craft trainee positions pursuant to the affirmative action program had resulted in junior black employees' receiving training in preference to senior white employees, thus discriminating against him and other white employees in violation of §§ 703(a) and (d) of Title VII. The company and the union argued they were implementing a policy to remedy historical disadvantages among blacks.

Judgment

Lower courts
Lower and federal courts supported Weber's claim that Title VII banned all forms of racial discrimination in employment whether against blacks or whites.

Supreme Court
By five to two the Supreme Court held that the affirmative action plan was lawful. The majority (Brennan, Stewart, White, Marshall and Blackmun JJ) held that Title VII did not prohibit all kinds of affirmative action programs. Section 703(d) of Title VII provides:

The Court held that "Weber's reliance upon a literal construction of the statutory provisions" was "misplaced" since "the plan does not unnecessarily trammel the interests of white employees." They held that the affirmative action plan was transitional in nature and was not intended to maintain racial balance, but simply to eliminate a manifest racial imbalance. The Court declined to set out specific elements of permissible affirmative action plans, saying: "It is not necessary in these cases to define the line of demarcation between permissible and impermissible affirmative action plans; it suffices to hold that the challenged Kaiser-USWA plan falls on the permissible side of the line."

Chief Justice Burger, dissenting, said he would be inclined to vote for the plan if he were a Member of Congress and this had been an amendment to the Act, but he was not, and Title VII explicitly prohibited all forms of racial discrimination and the company's practice "unquestionably discriminates on the basis of race against individual employees." Not having affirmative action was agreed to be the position when the Act was passed. He finished by quoting Benjamin Cardozo, The Nature of Judicial Process (1921) 141, warning to beware of the 'good result' and judges exceeding their authority to get it.

Justice Rehnquist dissented. He quoted George Orwell, Nineteen Eighty-four (1949) 181, where in a sudden jump, mid sentence, the government declares war on Eastasia instead, without blinking, and said this was like the approach to interpretation of the majority:

He cited two senators explaining precisely that the bill would not require a deliberate attempt to maintain a racial balance, because that would be recruiting on the basis of race, which would be unlawful. He explained the Senatorial exchange:

See also
 List of United States Supreme Court cases, volume 443
 Griggs v. Duke Power Co. (1971)
 Piscataway v. Taxman (3d Cir. 1996)
 Ricci v. DeStefano (2009)
 Bostock v. Clayton County (2020)

References

External links
 
Herndon, Randolph K.  "The Presence of State Action in United Steelworkers v. Weber."  Duke Law Journal.  Vol. 1980, No. 6. (Dec., 1980), pp. 1172–1200.  Accessed Jan. 29, 2007.
"What the Weber Ruling Does".  Time.  July 9, 1979.
"United Steelworkers v. Weber."  West's Encyclopedia of American Law.  The Gale Group, Inc.  1998.

United States Supreme Court cases
United States Supreme Court cases of the Burger Court
United Steelworkers litigation
United States affirmative action case law
1979 in United States case law
Kaiser Aluminum
United States labor case law
United States racial discrimination case law